Dominic Zamprogna (born April 21, 1979) is a Canadian actor and voice artist. He is perhaps best known for his roles on the television series Edgemont, Battlestar Galactica and General Hospital.

Early life
Zamprogna was born in Hamilton, Ontario, Canada. His parents operated a dance school and his father, Lou Zamprogna, was a dancer, choreographer, and ran an acting school at Theatre Aquarius. Zamprogna is the brother of Gema Zamprogna and twin of Amanda Zamprogna (both are actresses). He is of Italian descent.

As a child, Dominic enjoyed soccer and basketball and wanted to become a small athlete. He had some roles as a child actor, including F/X2 and the popular series Are You Afraid of the Dark?, in which he played Rush in "The Tale of Cutter's Treasure Part 1 and Part 2" and Jed in "The Tale of the Full Moon".

He attended the University of Toronto briefly, but left, later noting "I was no good at school work."

Career
In 1997, at the age of 18, Zamprogna appeared in the movie The Boys Club. In 2000, he was cast as Mark Deosdade, one of the lead roles in the Canadian teen drama series Edgemont; Zamprogna went on to appear in every episode of Edgemonts five seasons. Zamprogna also appeared in nine episodes of Battlestar Galactica, as well as in several films.

In 2009, Zamprogna joined the cast of ABC's daytime soap opera General Hospital as Dante Falconeri. For his role, Zamprogna received a Daytime Emmy Award nomination for outstanding supporting actor in 2014. In June 2018, he confirmed he was exiting the soap and had filmed his last scenes. He made a couple brief returns to the soap, first in November 2018, and again in March 2019. In May 2020, he expressed a desire to return to General Hospital, even to the point of signing a contract if one is offered. In July of the same year, it was announced that Zamprogna would return to the role, making his first re-appearance on August 3, 2020.

Personal life
On November 1, 2009, Zamprogna married his longtime girlfriend, Linda Leslie, in Los Angeles. His wife gave birth to their daughter, Anbilliene, on October 19, 2010. They welcomed their second daughter, Eliana, on December 30, 2012. Their third daughter, Adeline Pauline, was born on May 17, 2015.

Filmography

Awards and nominations

References

External links
 

1979 births
Canadian male film actors
Canadian male voice actors
Canadian male television actors
Canadian male soap opera actors
Male actors from Hamilton, Ontario
Canadian people of Italian descent
Canadian people of English descent
Living people
20th-century Canadian male actors
21st-century Canadian male actors